{{DISPLAYTITLE:C12H13NO2}}
The molecular formula C12H13NO2 (molar mass: 203.24 g/mol, exact mass: 203.0946 u) may refer to:

 Indole-3-butyric acid (IBA)
 Mesuximide
 Norsecurinine